Deus Salve o Rei (English: God Save the King) is a Brazilian telenovela produced and broadcast by TV Globo. It premiered on 9 January 2018, replacing Pega Pega, and ended on 30 July 2018. Created by Daniel Adjafre, it has artistic direction by Fabrício Mamberti, with the intention to capitalize on the success of Game of Thrones.

It stars Marina Ruy Barbosa, Bruna Marquezine, Rômulo Estrela, Ricardo Pereira, Johnny Massaro, Caio Blat, José Fidalgo, Tatá Werneck, and Special Participations Rosamaria Murtinho, Marco Nanini.

Production

Casting
Agatha Moreira had been chosen as Amália's interpreter but was replaced by Marina Ruy Barbosa after TV Globo reassigned actors scaled initially to O Sétimo Guardião by Aguinaldo Silva, which was later cancelled after controversy over plagiarism.

Renato Góes was initially cast as Afonso, but left during the production stage and was replaced by Rômulo Estrela.

Set design

Originally planned that part of the cast would be sent to Europe to begin principal photography, the Globo management judged that, with the inflated high value of the euro, together with all the expenses that come with it in all the sectors in Brazil, it would exceed the estimated budget. Only the recording and effects team was sent out of the country to capture aerial scenes of the woods and mountains to be superimposed on scenes recorded in the Projac studios in Brazil. In March 2017, the recording crew traveled to Spain, Scotland and Iceland to capture the external scenes, as in ancient castles and historically preserved villages. The scenographic city was set up in the Globo Studios, in Rio de Janeiro, with a total of 1,8 thousand square meters. Scenes that were supposed to look external were actually filmed by chroma keying the images taken in Europe were digitally added, including forests, villages and pastures.

Plot
The medieval plot presents the fictional kingdoms of Montemor and Artena. The kingdoms have an agreement to supply water, which is scarce in Montemor but is abundant in Artena. In return, Montemor supplies ore to Artena. This agreement lasts until the death of the queen of Montemor, Crisélia (Rosamaria Murtinho), that will shake the peace between the kingdoms. Afonso (Rômulo Estrela) is the crown prince of Montemor and, from childhood, was raised to assume the throne; honoured and fair, he is the opposite of his younger brother—the irresponsible and inconsequential Rodolfo (Johnny Massaro), who only thinks about stewardship. After falling in love with a plebeian from Artena named Amália (Marina Ruy Barbosa), Afonso abdicates the throne, giving it to his unprepared brother. This makes relations with the neighbouring kingdom even more fragile. This will open the opportunity for Catarina (Bruna Marquezine) to expand her ambitious plans in Montemor. She is the spoiled and ambitious princess and daughter of the wise and benevolent King Augusto (Marco Nanini), of Artena.

Cast

Main 
 Marina Ruy Barbosa as Amália Giordano
 Rômulo Estrela as Afonso de Monferrato, King of Montemor
 Bruna Marquezine as Catarina de Lurton, Queen of Artena and Montemor
 Johnny Massaro as Rodolfo de Monferrato, King of Alcaluz and Prince of Montemor
 Tatá Werneck as Lucrécia de Vilarosso, Princess of Alcaluz
 Ricardo Pereira as Virgílio Salazar
 Marco Nanini as Augusto de Lurton, King of Artena
 Caio Blat as Cássio
 Alexandre Borges as Otávio de Cáseres, King of Lastrilha
 Fernanda Nobre as Diana de Semineli
 Bia Arantes as Brice
 Marina Moschen as Selena de Cáseres
 Vinícius Redd as Thiago Giordano
 Débora Olivieri as Constância Giordano
 Giulio Lopes as Martinho Giordano
 Marcello Airoldi as Romero
 Giovanni Di Lorenzi as Ulisses
 Leandro Daniel as Petrônio
 Daniel Warren as Orlando
 Monique Alfradique as Glória
 Betty Gofman as Nalanda (Naná)
 Marcos Oliveira as Heráclito de Fernandes, Count of Alcaluz
 Mel Maia as Agnes
 João Vithor Oliveira as Saulo
 Rafael Primot as Osiel
 Carolina Ferman as Lucíola Tretino
 Tobias Carrieres as Levi
 Tarcísio Filho as Demétrio
 Dayse Pozato as Betânia
 Maria Manoella as Mirtes
 Aramis Trindade as Olegário
 Pascoal da Conceição as Lupércio
 Cristiana Pompeo as Matilda
 Walter Breda as Enoque
 Rafa Vachaud as Eustáquio
 Isadora Ferrite as Brumela
 Júlia Guerra as Latrine
 Liéser Touma as Timóteo
 Ancelmo Gonçalves as Oráculo

Guest cast

 Rosamaria Murtinho as Crisélia De Monferrato, Queen of Montemor
 José Fidalgo as Constantino De Artanza, Duke of Vicenza
 Vinicius Calderoni as Istvan, Marquess of Córdona
 Paula Fernandes as Rosana
 Renata Dominguez as Belisa
 Caco Ciocler as Hermes
 Junior Prata as Fúlvio Brancatti
 André Segatti as Henri
 Ilya São Paulo as Nadja
 Rosa Marya Colin as Mandingueira
 Joana Borges as Tila
 Rita Elmôr as Larissa
 Ricardo Blat as Issandro 
 André Segatti as Eloy
 Naruna Costa as Samara
 Ana Paula Botelho	as Muriel	
 Gabriel Palhares as Tácitus
 Anne Berg as Lurdes
 Cláudio Garcia as Helvio
 Fifo Benicasa as Tirso
 Samuel Vieira as Josafá
 Márcia Manfredini as Rebeca
 Marcelo Müller as Julião
 Priscila Castello Branco as Teodora
 Ricardo Lyra Jr as Hugo
 Jack Berraquero as Valentim
 Antônio Barboza as Simão
 Adriana Bellonga as Domingas
 Camille Leite as Geórgia
 Joana Borges as Tila
 Jaedson Bahia as Delano

Soundtrack 

Deus Salve o Rei — Música Original de Alexandre de Faria was released on 4 May 2018 by Som Livre.

Ratings

References

External links
  
 

TV Globo telenovelas
Brazilian telenovelas
2018 Brazilian television series debuts
2018 Brazilian television series endings
2018 telenovelas
Brazilian LGBT-related television shows
Portuguese-language telenovelas
Television series set in the Middle Ages